Nothoprocta is a genus of birds belonging to the tinamou family Tinamidae. They inhabit scrubland, grassland and open woodland in western South America, particularly in the Andes. They are poor fliers and spend most of their time on the ground. Their diet includes seeds and insects. They nest on the ground, laying large glossy eggs. The eggs are covered with feathers when a potential predator is nearby.

They have strong legs and fairly long, downcurved bills. The plumage is mostly grey-brown with intricate black, white and buff markings. The birds have loud, whistling calls.

Species list
There are at least six species in the genus. A seventh species, Kalinowski's tinamou, Nothoprocta kalinowskii, is sometimes recognized but is more likely to be a junior synonym of Nothoprocta ornata branickii, a subspecies of the ornate tinamou. The SACC voted to demote the Kalinowski's Tinamou, on 14 Feb 2007.

 Nothoprocta taczanowskii, Taczanowski's tinamou, located in the Andes of south central Peru
 Nothoprocta ornata, ornate tinamou, located in southern and central Peru, southwestern Bolivia, northern Chile, and northwestern Argentina
 Nothoprocta ornata ornata located in southeastern Peru, northern Chile, and western Bolivia
 Nothoprocta ornata branickii located in central Peru
 Nothoprocta ornata rostrata located in northwestern Argentina
 Nothoprocta perdicaria, Chilean tinamou, located in central Chile
 Nothprocta pedicaria pedicaria located in north central Chile
 Nothprocta pedicaria sanborni located in south central Chile
 Nothoprocta cinerascens, brushland tinamou, located in southeastern Bolivia, northwestern Paraguay, and northern to central Argentina
 Nothprocta cinerascens cinerascens located in southeastern Bolivia, northwestern Paraguay, and central Argentina
 Nothoprocta cinerascens parvimaculata located in northwestern Argentina
 Nothoprocta pentlandii, Andean tinamou, located in the Andes of northern and central Argentina, northern Chile, southwestern Ecuador, southwestern Bolivia, and western Peru
 Nothoprocta pentlandii pentlandii located in western Bolivia, northwestern Argentina, and northern Chile
 Nothoprocta pentlandii ambigua located in southern Ecuador and northwestern Peru
 Nothoprocta pentlandii oustaleti located in central and southern Peru
 Nothoprocta pentlandii niethammeri located in central Peru
 Nothoprocta pentlandii fulvescens located in southeastern Peru
 Nothoprocta pentlandii doeringi located in central Argentina
 Nothoprocta pentlandii mendozae located in west central Argentina
 Nothoprocta curvirostris, curve-billed tinamou, located in the Andes of southern Ecuador to northern Peru
 Nothoprocta curvirostris curvirostris located in central Ecuador and northern Peru
 Nothoprocta curvirostris peruviana located in northern and central Peru

Etymology
Nothoprocta comes from two Ancient Greek words: nothos meaning 'spurious, counterfeit', and prōktos 'anus'.  This combination of words probably has to do with the tail being small and covered with body feathers, therefore looking fake.

Footnotes

References
 
 
Krabbe, Niels & Schulenberg, Thomas S. (2005). "A mystery solved: the identity and distribution of Kalinowski's Tinamou (Nothoprocta kalinowskii)", Bulletin of the British Ornithologists' Club 125(4): 253-260<
Mata, Jorge R. Rodriguez; Erize, Francisco & Rumboll, Maurice (2006). A Field Guide to the Birds of South America: Non-Passerines, HarperCollins, London.
Perrins, Christopher, ed. (2004). The New Encyclopedia of Birds, Oxford University Press, Oxford.
 

 
Bird genera
Taxa named by Philip Sclater
Taxa named by Osbert Salvin